An Hfq binding sRNA is an sRNA that binds the bacterial RNA binding protein called Hfq. A number of bacterial small RNAs which have been shown to bind to Hfq have been characterised (see list).
Many of these RNAs share a similar structure composed of three stem-loops.  Several studies have expanded this list, and experimentally validated a total of 64 Hfq binding sRNA in Salmonella Typhimurium. A transcriptome wide study on Hfq binding sites in Salmonella mapped 126 Hfq binding sites within sRNAs. Genomic SELEX has been used to show that Hfq binding RNAs are enriched in the sequence motif 5′-AAYAAYAA-3′. Genome-wide study identified 40 candidate Hfq-dependent sRNAs in plant pathogen Erwinia amylovora. 12 of them were confirmed by Northern blot.

Bacterial Hfq binding sRNAs

 DicF RNA
 DsrA RNA
 FnrS RNA
 GadY RNA
 GcvB RNA
 IsrJ RNA
 MicA RNA / SraD RNA
 MicC RNA
 MicF RNA
 OmrA RNA / OmrB RNA / RygA RNA / RygB RNA / SraE RNA
 OxyS RNA
 Qrr RNA
 RmA RNA
 RprA RNA
 RybB RNA
 RydC RNA
 RyeB RNA
 CyaR RNA
 RyeF
 RyhB RNA
 SgrS RNA
 Spot 42 RNA
 SraH RNA
 SraJ RNA
 SroB RNA / MicM RNA / RybC
 SroC RNA

References

Further reading

External links
Rfam database

Non-coding RNA